Gaetano Carboni (born 11 June 1955) is an Italian former swimmer. He competed in the men's 200 metre butterfly at the 1972 Summer Olympics.

References

1955 births
Living people
Italian male swimmers
Olympic swimmers of Italy
Swimmers at the 1972 Summer Olympics
People from Sant'Elpidio a Mare